Noisy Creek Glacier is in North Cascades National Park in the U.S. state of Washington,  northwest of Bacon Peak. Noisy Creek Glacier has retreated and left behind a series of small proglacial lakes. A ridge separates Noisy Creek Glacier from Green Lake Glacier to the east. The National Park Service is currently studying Noisy Creek Glacier as part of their glacier monitoring project. Between 1993 (when monitoring began), and 2013 the glacier had lost ~8 m of thickness.

See also
List of glaciers in the United States

References

Glaciers of the North Cascades
Cirques of the United States
Glaciers of Whatcom County, Washington
Glaciers of Washington (state)